The Women's junior time trial at the 2013 European Road Championships took place on 19 July. The Championships were hosted by the Czech Republic city of Olomouc. The course was 13.2 km long. 39 junior cyclists competed in this discipline.

Top 10 final classification

See also

 2013 European Road Championships – Women's junior road race

References

2013 European Road Championships
2013 in women's road cycling